The Lekwungen or Lekungen nation (lək̓ʷəŋən often called the Songhees or Songish by non-Lekwungens) are an Indigenous North American Coast Salish people who reside on southeastern Vancouver Island, British Columbia in the Greater Victoria area.  Their government is the Songhees First Nation, a member of the Te'mexw Treaty Association and the Naut'sa Mawt Tribal Council.  Their traditional language is Lekwungen, a dialect of the North Straits Salish language.

Pre-colonization
There is evidence of a fortified village existing at Finlayson Point in Beacon Hill Park prior to the arrival of Europeans in the late eighteenth and early nineteenth centuries. Before European contact much of the government was through a clan system, with twelve clans which each had its own fishing and hunting territory. Chiefship was hereditary in the male line and there were three castes - nobles, commons, and slaves. Like other north-west coast tribes they practiced potlatch and ceremonial gift distribution. The dead were buried in canoes or boxes upon the surface of the ground, or laid away in trees.  Mentioning the names of a dead person was taboo. The Coast Salish traditionally lived in bighouses, which were large rectangular communal houses of cedar planks, adorned with carved and jointed totem posts.

Sitchanalth
A major Coast Salish seaport community called Sitchanalth was located in the area now known as Willows Beach in Oak Bay, British Columbia. It is estimated the population of the village at its peak was around 10,000 people.

Sitchanalth was destroyed by a tsunami related to a major earthquake along the Devils Mountain Fault that occurred around 930 A.D. The death toll from the earthquake and resulting tsunami have been described as "catastrophic" with a small group of survivors relocating from Willows Beach to what is now the Inner Harbour area of Victoria, British Columbia

A cairn at Willows Beach marks the spot where the ancient settlement once stood.

Cuisine and medicine
The Songhees' traditional foods included salmon, shellfish, whale, deer, duck, berries, camas root, and herbs.

Colonization
The Songhees population was estimated to be 8,500 in 1859, but by 1914  the population had decreased to less than 200.

At the time of the establishment of Fort Victoria  by the British in 1843, a Songhees village was situated adjacent to the fort.  The village was subsequently moved across Victoria Harbour in what is now the Victoria West neighbourhood.  The village was subsequently moved and a reserve established adjacent to what is now the municipality of View Royal. A traditional blessing in Lekwungen appears on a mural on the Ogden Point breakwater.

During the 1862 Pacific Northwest smallpox epidemic, which killed about two-thirds of all native people in British Columbia, the Songhees were largely spared due to smallpox vaccines given by Hudson's Bay Company physician Dr. John Helmcken, as well as Songhees self-quarantining themselves on Discovery Island. Due to these things the Songhees survived the epidemic with few deaths.

Douglas Treaties

Sir James Douglas, governor of Vancouver Island negotiated a treaty with the Songhees in 1850.  Much of the traditional territory of the Songhees now forms the core of the urbanized area of Victoria and surrounding municipalities.  The development of British Columbia's capital city caused considerable disruption to the Songhees' traditional economy and livelihood.

Recently the Songhees considered that the government of British Columbia had failed to honour the 1850 treaty and commenced a legal action against the province and the government of Canada for redress.  A settlement of the action was announced in November 2006 by Songhees Chief Robert Sam, the federal Minister of Indian Affairs and Northern Development, Jim Prentice, and the provincial Minister of Aboriginal Relations and Reconciliation, Mike de Jong.

See also
Naut'sa Mawt Tribal Council
Songhees First Nation

References

External links
 Songhees Nation website

Coast Salish
First Nations in British Columbia
Victoria, British Columbia